Denis Auguste Duchene (23 September 1862 - 9 June 1950) was a French World War I general.

He was born on 23 September 1862 at Juzennecourt, Haute-Marne and died on 9 June 1950 at Bihorel, Seine-Inférieure. He was promoted General de Brigade (brigadier-general) on 27 October 1914, then acting General de Division (equivalent to the Anglophone rank of major-general) on 12 March 1915 with the rank confirmed on 28 September 1916.
He commanded the French Tenth Army between December 1916 and December 1917.

Duchêne is best known for his command of the French Sixth Army from December 1917 to June 1918. During the Third Battle of the Aisne (the Blücher-Yorck phase of the German spring offensive), Duchêne's group held the high ground of the Chemin des Dames. However, he was openly contemptuous of General Philippe Petain's order to maintain a defence in depth, preferring instead to consolidate his troops in the front line.  When the Germans attacked in late May 1918, his line broke and crossed the river Aisne. The German armies poured through, taking 19 kilometres in three days, and putting Paris within their reach.

Duchêne was relieved of his command by French Prime Minister Georges Clemenceau on 9 June 1918. He remained in the army however and was made a Grand Officer of the Légion d'honneur on 16 June 1920. He retired in 1924 as head of the III Corps.

See also
Marching Regiment of the Foreign Legion

Notes and references

First World War Retrieved: 8 November 1918.

1862 births
1950 deaths
French generals
French military personnel of World War I
Grand Officiers of the Légion d'honneur
Recipients of the Croix de Guerre 1914–1918 (France)